Isopogon longifolius is a species of flowering plant in the family Proteaceae and is endemic to the southwest of Western Australia. It is a shrub with simple, linear, or deeply divided leaves and sessile, spherical heads of silky-hairy, yellow flowers and spherical to oval cone.

Description

Taxonomy
Isopogon longifolius was first formally described by botanist Robert Brown in Transactions of the Linnean Society of London in 1810.

In 1891, German botanist Otto Kuntze published Revisio generum plantarum, his response to what he perceived as a lack of method in existing nomenclatural practice. Because Isopogon was based on Isopogon anemonifolius, and that species had already been placed by Richard Salisbury in the segregate genus Atylus in 1807, Kuntze revived the latter genus on the grounds of priority, and made the new combination Atylus longifolius for this species. However, Kuntze's revisionary program was not accepted by the majority of botanists. Ultimately, the genus Isopogon was nomenclaturally conserved over Atylus by the International Botanical Congress of 1905.

Distribution and habitat
This species often grows on sandstone hills in heath or shrubland and is found on the Stirling Range, the Porongurup Range, near Albany, Walpole and Cranbrook and on the coast towards Bremer Bay.

Conservation status
Isopogon longifolius is listed as "not threatened" by the Western Australian Government Department of Biodiversity, Conservation and Attractions.

References

External links
 The Australasian Virtual Herbarium – Occurrence data for Isopogon longifolius
 Google images: Isopogon longifolius

Eudicots of Western Australia
longifolius
Plants described in 1810
Taxa named by Robert Brown (botanist, born 1773)